The 2001–02 Alpha Ethniki was the 66th season of the highest football league of Greece. The season began on 22 September 2001 and ended on 8 May 2002. Olympiacos won their sixth consecutive and 31st Greek title.

Teams

Stadia and personnel

 1 On final match day of the season, played on 8 May 2002.

League table

Results

Top scorers
Source: Galanis Sports Data

External links
 Greek Wikipedia
 Official Greek FA Site
 Greek SuperLeague official Site
 SuperLeague Statistics

Alpha Ethniki seasons
Greece
1